Glenn Christopher Scarpelli (born July 6, 1966) is an American actor and singer. He played Alex Handris from 1980 to 1983 on the sitcom One Day at a Time.

Early life
Born in Staten Island, New York City, New York, he is the son of long time Archie Comics artist Henry Scarpelli. (Glenn was featured in issue #330 of Archie, dated July 1984).  He attended a private Catholic school, St. Joseph Hill Academy, from kindergarten to 8th grade.

Career
In 1977, at the age of 10, Scarpelli made his Broadway debut, appearing  in the play Golda with Anne Bancroft.  He returned to the stage in 1979 with the role of Richard, Duke of York in the Broadway revival of Richard III starring Al Pacino.

Scarpelli's role as Alex Handris (1980–83) on the long-running television situation comedy One Day at a Time is his most prominent.  After learning that for the show's 9th season he would be reduced to only appearing in six episodes, he chose to leave the series to appear in the NBC sitcom Jennifer Slept Here.  Other television appearances include 3-2-1 Contact, Steven Spielberg's Amazing Stories, MacGyver and The Love Boat. He was also a co-host in summer 1983 of the NBC game show/human interest show Fantasy.

He released a self-titled pop album in 1983, which included the single "Get a Love On".

More recently, Scarpelli had a cameo role in the Netflix revival of One Day at a Time during its third season, released in 2019.

Personal life
Scarpelli came out as gay in adulthood. In 1986 when he was 20 years old, he started dating Gary Scalzo, a 30 year-old talent agent, and the two became partners. In 1987, Scalzo was diagnosed with AIDS. He died at age 36 on July 29, 1992. Scarpelli resides in Sedona, Arizona, where he and his then-partner Jude Belanger established the Sedona Now Network, a community television station, in 2003. Scarpelli and Belanger were married in California in 2008, but filed for divorce in 2012.

He remained close friends with One Day at a Time co-stars Mackenzie Phillips and Bonnie Franklin until her death in 2013.

Filmography

Stage productions

Broadway

Discography

References

External links
 
 Sedona Now Network website

1966 births
American male television actors
American male child actors
Living people
People from Staten Island
American people of Italian descent
People from Sedona, Arizona
American gay actors
LGBT people from New York (state)
LGBT people from Arizona